Florence Ethel Birchenough (13 January 1894 – 3 July 1973) was a British track and field athlete, recognised as the first British woman to find international success in throwing events.

Born at Acton Green, then in Middlesex, she attended Haberdashers' Aske's School for Girls then located on Creffield Road, Acton from 1905 until 1911, before joining the Regent Street Polytechnic, where she studied gymnastics and completed the British Association for Physical Training diploma, to qualify as a teacher of the sport.  She began practising the discus, javelin and shot put, and as one of the first British women to do so, photographs of her demonstrating the events were used in Sophie Eliott-Lynn's 1925 book, Athletics for Women and Girls.

Birchenough's first international competition was the 1921 Women's Olympiad in Monte Carlo, where she formed part of a team representing the Polytechnic, and won the javelin competition. The following year, she was a founder of the Women's Amateur Athletic Association (WAAA) and in 1923 participated at the first WAAA Championships becoming british champion in shot-put. She also held its discus title from 1924 until 1928. In 1924 the participated in the 1924 Women's Olympiad taking the bronze medal in the discus throw. By 1927, she had at some point held the British record in all three of her events.  She captained the British team at the 1926 Women's World Games.

Birchenough married Henry Jack Millichap in 1932 and remained involved in athletics as an official of the WAAA.

References

1894 births
1973 deaths
English female discus throwers
English female javelin throwers
English female shot putters
People from Acton, London
Women's World Games medalists